Budhanwala is a village in Shahkot in Jalandhar district of Punjab State, India. The village is administrated by a sarpanch, an elected representative of the village.

Demography 
In 2011, the village had 153 houses and a population of 678 (329 males and 349 females). According to the report published by Census India in 2011, of the total population of the village, 305 people were from Schedule Castes and the village did not have any Schedule Tribe population.

See also
List of villages in India

References

External links 
 Tourism of Punjab
 Census of Punjab

Villages in Jalandhar district